SG Oslebshausen was a basketball club from Bremen, Germany.
The club men's senior team was playing in the German ‘’Regionalliga’’ (4th Division) until 2010. Then the team withdrew from the league because of financial problems.
Between 2002 and 2009 the club became well known for the basketball operations of the Bremen Roosters which played in Germany's second division Pro A but is now defunct.

2009-2010 roster 

Roster updated 03-26-2010

Notable former players

Andre Bade  <small>

Chaz Carr  <small>

Taha Alassari  <small>

References

External links
Team Homepage

Basketball teams established in 2002
Basketball teams in Germany
Sport in Bremen (city)